Troy, also historically known as either Skinner Village or Skinnerville, is a populated place situated in Pinal County, Arizona, United States. Its name became official by a decision by the Board on Geographic Names in 1965.

References

External links
 Troy – ghosttowns.com

Ghost towns in Arizona
Populated places in Pinal County, Arizona